Quaye MacGranaky Ben Mensa is a Ghanaian engineer and politician. He served as a member of First Parliament of the Fourth Republic of Ghana for Dade-Kotopon constituency in the Greater Accra region of Ghana.

Early life and education 
Mensa was born in 1939, He attended Technishe Hoschule where he obtained a Doctor of Philosophy in Engineering.

Career 
Mensa was the former member of the First Parliament of the Fourth Republic of Ghana from 7 January 1993 to 6 January 1997. He is an Engineer.

Politics 
Quaye MacGranaky Ben Mensa was first elected into parliament during the 1992 Ghanaian parliamentary election on the ticket of the National Democratic Congress as member of the First Parliament of the Fourth Republic of Ghana.

During the 1996 Ghanaian general election, Sylvester A. Mensah took the seat for the National Democratic Congress with 36,959 votes representing 41.50% of the share defeating Cecilia Eguakun of New Patriotic Party who had 30,484 votes, Mensa Mac Granaky Quaye an Independent at this time who had 3,919 votes which represented 4.40% of the total valid votes cast, Christian Randolph Lartey of the People's National Convention who had 1,703 votes which represented 1.90% of the total votes cast, Ivor Kobina Greenstreet of the Convention People's Party  and Abdul Rashid Boi-Nai an Independent had no votes.

Personal life 
He is a Christian.

References 

1939 births
Ghanaian MPs 1993–1997
Ghanaian engineers
People from Greater Accra Region
National Democratic Congress (Ghana) politicians
Ghanaian Christians
Living people